Indrani Chakraborty (born 20 December 1987), known by her stage name Mishti, is an Indian actress who predominantly appears in Telugu and Hindi films. She starred in films such as Kaanchi: The Unbreakable (2014), Chinnadana Nee Kosam (2014), Adam Joan (2017), Brihaspathi (2018), and Burra Katha (2019) among others.

Early life
Mishti was born as Indrani Chakraborty on 20 December 1987, in a Bengali family in Kolkata, West Bengal, India. Her mother Beena Chakraborty is a housewife and her father is a construction businessman. She graduated in English literature from the University of Calcutta.

She began to use the name Mishti professionally after 2014.

Career 
She made her Bollywood debut with Subhash Ghai's  film Kaanchi: The Unbreakable, and her Telugu film debut with the Nithiin-A. Karunakaran film Chinnadana Nee Kosam.  and her Malayalam film debut with Prithviraj Sukumaran and Jinu Abraham's film Adam Joan

Mishti's next Telugu film, Columbus, stars Sumanth Ashwin and is produced by MS Raju. She returned to Bollywood with Indra Kumar's Great Grand Masti, the third film in the Masti film series. In 2017, she appeared in Srijit Mukherji's historical film Begum Jaan, alongside Naseeruddin Shah and Vidya Balan. The Film was set in the Backdrop of a Brothel and she played Shabnam in the film. The film was an average grosser at Box Office India.

Advertisements
Mishti is the brand ambassador for Vicco turmeric.

Filmography

References

External links

Living people
1987 births
Actresses from Kolkata
Indian film actresses
Bengali actresses
Actresses in Bengali cinema
Actresses in Hindi cinema
Actresses in Telugu cinema
Actresses in Malayalam cinema
Actresses in Kannada cinema
Actresses in Tamil cinema
University of Calcutta alumni
21st-century Bengalis
21st-century Indian actresses